Def Jam's How to Be a Player soundtrack is the soundtrack to the 1997 comedy film, Def Jam's How to Be a Player. It was released on August 5, 1997, through Def Jam Recordings.

The soundtrack, which consisted of a blend of hip hop and contemporary R&B, did well on the Billboard charts, peaking at 7 on the Billboard 200 and 2 on the Top R&B/Hip-Hop Albums. Six weeks later the album was certified Gold by the RIAA for sales of over 500,000 copies.

Foxy Brown and Dru Hill's single "Big Bad Mamma" was the soundtrack's most successful single, peaking at 53 on the Billboard Hot 100. Absoulute's "Never Wanna Let You Go" also made it the Billboard charts, reaching the R&B chart. "Young Casanovas" was also a single and had a music video. The soundtrack version featured Mase singing the hook, while the music video version had LeVert singing it in his place. The music video version was also shorter.

Track listing
"Intro-"- :41 (Max Julien) 
"Big Bad Mamma"- 3:53 (Foxy Brown and Dru Hill)
"Hard to Get"- 5:10 (Richie Rich and Rick James) 
"I Gotta Know"- 3:57 (Playa and Foxy Brown)
"Young Casanovas"- 4:22 (Junior M.A.F.I.A., Mase, Cam'ron and LeVert)  
"Down Wit Us"- 3:18 (Redman) 
"Usual Suspects"- 4:41 (Mic Geronimo, DMX, Cormega, Ja Rule, and Hussein Fatal)  
"How to Be a Playa"- 5:15 (Master P, Fiend and Silkk the Shocker) 
"It's a Cold Day"- 4:53 (Too Short, George Clinton and Belita Woods) 
"Interlude"- :53 (Max Julien) 
"Street 2 Street"- 3:43 (Jayo Felony)
"In the Wind"- 4:40 (8Ball & MJG) 
"Never Seen Before"- 2:53 (EPMD) 
"Never Wanna Let You Go"- 4:23 (Absoulute) 
"When the Playas Live"- 4:57 (Crucial Conflict)  
"Troublesome"- 3:50 (2Pac) 
"Say What"- 4:00 (Dymon) 
"If U Stay Ready"- 5:00 (Suga Free)
"Don't Ever"- 3:48 (Black Azz Chill)
"Outro"- 1:07 (Max Julien)

The vinyl edition has a different track order & several more Max Julien interludes, plus bonus tracks by Made Men & Kaboom.

Side 1:
 Intro (Max Julien)
 Interlude (Max Julien)
 Big Bad Mamma (Foxy Brown and Dru Hill)
 Interlude (Max Julien)
 The Usual Suspects (Mic Geronimo, DMX, Cormega, Ja Rule, and Hussein Fatal)
 Interlude (Max Julien)
 It's A Cold Day (The Funk Wit U Mix) (Too Short, George Clinton and Belita Woods)
 Interlude (Max Julien)
 If U Stay Ready (Suga Free)
 Interlude (Max Julien)
 In The Wind (8Ball & MJG)

Side 2:
 Interlude (Max Julien)
 Hard To Get (Revisited) (Richie Rich and Rick James)
 Interlude (Max Julien)
 I Gotta Know (Playa and Foxy Brown)
 Interlude (Max Julien)
 Say What (Dymon)
 Interlude (Max Julien)
 Don't Ever (Black Azz Chill)
 Interlude (Max Julien)
 Never Wanna Let You Go (Absoulute)

Side 3:
 Interlude (Max Julien)
 Down Wit Us (Redman)
 Interlude (Max Julien)
 How To Be A Playa (Master P, Fiend and Silkk the Shocker)
 Interlude (Max Julien)
 Troublesome (2Pac)
 Interlude (Max Julien)
 Adidas (Made Men ft. Havoc (musician) of Mobb Deep and Man Terror)

Side 4:
 Interlude (Max Julien)
 Never Seen Before (EPMD)
 Interlude (Max Julien)
 Young Casanovas (Junior M.A.F.I.A., Mase and Cam'ron)
 Interlude (Max Julien)
 When The Playas Live (Crucial Conflict)
 Interlude (Max Julien)
 Is It? (Kaboom)
 Interlude (Max Julien)
 Street 2 Street (Jayo Felony)
 Outro (Max Julien)

Charts

Weekly charts

Year-end charts

Certifications

References

Comedy film soundtracks
Hip hop soundtracks
1997 soundtrack albums
Def Jam Recordings soundtracks
Albums produced by DJ Quik
Albums produced by G-One